Love Comes to the Executioner is a 2006 American film directed and written by Kyle Bergersen, starring Jonathan Tucker, Jeremy Renner, and Ginnifer Goodwin.

Plot summary
A young man becomes the executioner at a prison, where his brother sits on death row. Things get more surreal when he falls in love with his ex-girlfriend.

Cast
Jonathan Tucker as Heck Prigusivac
Jeremy Renner as Chick Prigusivac
Ginnifer Goodwin as Dori Dumchovic
Christine Ebersole as Miriam Prigusivac
Michael Fairman as Warden Stankovic
Sean Sweeney as Bix
Neil Giuntoli as Harry Grmusa
Googy Gress as Doc Zdravkovic 
Bodhi Elfman as Krist Skolnik

References

External links

2006 films
2006 black comedy films
2006 comedy-drama films
American black comedy films
American comedy-drama films
2006 comedy films
2000s English-language films
2000s American films